Shubin , or Shubina (feminine; Шубина), is a Russian-language surname. It derived from the Russian word шуба shuba meaning fur coat.

People with the surname Shubin include:
 Alexander Shubin (b. 1983), Russian figure skater
 Fedot Shubin (1740–1805), Russian sculptor
 Joel Shubin (b. 1942), Russian American writer
 Igor Shubin (b. 1958), Russian politician
 Kirill Shubin (b. 2003), Russian chess master
 Lester Shubin (1925–2009), American inventor
 Mikhail Shubin (mathematician) (1944–2020), Russian-American mathematician
 Mikhail Shubin (triathlete) (b. 1988), Russian triathlete
Murray J. Shubin (1917–1956), American flying ace during World War II
 Neil Shubin (b. 1960), American biologist and science writer
 Nikolay Shubin (b. 1956), Georgian-born Russian serial killer
 Steve Shubin, founder and CEO of Interactive Life Forms, an adult sex toy company
 Tatiana Shubin, Soviet American mathematician

People with the surname Shubina include:
 Ekaterina Shubina, Canoer at the 2006 Asian Games
 Galina Shubina (1902–1980), Russian poster and graphics artist
 Lyudmila Shubina (b. 1948), Soviet Azerbaijani handball player
 Mariya Shubina (b. 1930), Soviet sprint canoer

See also
 Shubin (ghost), mythological Ukrainian spirit or ghost found in mines
 Zhang Shubin (b. 1966), retired Chinese figure skater

Russian-language surnames